Ali Qandi (also Romanized as ‘Alī Qandī; also known as ‘Alī Kandī) is a village in Godeh Rural District, in the Central District of Bastak County, Hormozgan Province, Iran. At the 2006 census, its population was 225, in 52 families.

References 

Populated places in Bastak County